is a railway station in the town of Nagiso, Nagano Prefecture, Japan, operated by Central Japan Railway Company (JR Tōkai).

Lines

Layout
The station has one side platform and one island platform connected by a footbridge. The station is staffed.

Platforms

Adjacent stations

History
It was renamed Nagiso Station on 1 October 1968. With the privatization of JNR on 1 April 1987, the station came under the control of JR Central.

Passenger statistics
In fiscal 2015, the station was used by an average of 303 passengers daily (boarding passengers only).

Surrounding area
Nagiso Town Hall
Nagiso Junior High School

See also

 List of Railway Stations in Japan

References

External links

Railway stations in Nagano Prefecture
Chūō Main Line
Stations of Central Japan Railway Company
Railway stations in Japan opened in 1909
Nagiso, Nagano